Thrincophora signigerana is a species of moth of the  family Tortricidae. It is found in Australia (including South Australia, Victoria and Tasmania).

The wingspan is about 30 mm. The forewings are grey brown with a complex pattern. The hindwings are pale brown, becoming darker towards the margins.

The larvae feed within the seedpods of Acacia obliquinervia.

References

Moths described in 1863
Archipini